Valgerður Bjarnadóttir (born 13 January 1950) is an Icelandic politician.

External links
Non auto-biography of Valgerður Bjarnadóttir on the parliament website

Valgerdur Bjarnadottir
Living people
1950 births
Valgerdur Bjarnadottir
Place of birth missing (living people)
University of Iceland alumni